Emanuele Del Vecchio, commonly known as Del Vecchio (24 September 1934 – 7 October 1995), was a Brazilian football forward, who played for the Brazil national team.

Club career
Born in São Vicente, São Paulo, Del Vecchio started his career in 1954, defending Santos, and being part of the squad that won the Campeonato Paulista in 1955 and in 1956, finishing as that competition's top goalscorer with 23 goals in 1955. He then transferred to Italy, where he scored 13 goals in the 27 Italian Serie A games he played for Verona. Del Vecchio then played 68 Italian League games and scored 27 goals for Napoli, before moving to Padova, where he scored eight goals in 21 games. After joining Milan, he won the local league in 1962, and scored three goals in the nine games he played for the club. Del Vecchio returned to Padova in 1962, playing four more games for the club. He played six Argentine League games and scored three goals for Boca Juniors of Argentina, before returning to Brazil where he played for São Paulo, Bangu and Atlético Paranaense before retiring.

International career
Del Vecchio played nine games and scored a goal for the Brazil national team between 1956 and 1957. Among the games he played include four appearances in the South American Championship in 1956, where the Brazilian team managed a fourth–place finish. Del Vecchio played his first game on 24 January 1956, against Chile, scoring his only goal for the national team on  16 June 1957, against Portugal. He played his last game on 10 July 1957, against Argentina. Defending his country, he won the Roca Cup in 1955.

Honours

Club
Milan
Serie A: 1962

Santos
Campeonato Paulista: 1955, 1956

International
Brazil
Roca Cup: 1955

Individual
Campeonato Paulista top goalscorer: 1955

References

1934 births
1995 deaths
People from São Vicente, São Paulo
Brazilian footballers
Brazil international footballers
Santos FC players
Hellas Verona F.C. players
S.S.C. Napoli players
A.C. Milan players
Boca Juniors footballers
São Paulo FC players
Bangu Atlético Clube players
Club Athletico Paranaense players
Brazilian expatriate footballers
Expatriate footballers in Argentina
Expatriate footballers in Italy
Serie A players
Argentine Primera División players
Association football forwards
Brazilian expatriate sportspeople in Argentina
Brazilian expatriate sportspeople in Italy
Footballers from São Paulo (state)